The sixth Rugby League World Cup was held in France in October and November 1972. Australia started as the favourites to retain the trophy they had won just two years previously. New Zealand had beaten all three of the other nations in 1971 and France were expected to be tough opponents on their home soil. In the event Great Britain confounded most expectations by running out worthy winners and levelling their tally of World Cup wins at 3–3 with the Australians.

The final was held at Stade Gerland in Lyon. Great Britain played Australia and in the end, with scores level and unchanged after extra time, claimed the cup on league placing.

This was the last World Cup to be played under the four-tackle rule.

Squads

Venues

Final Venue

Results

Group stage

Final 

The French public seemed uninterested in a final that did not involve the home team, as just over 4,200 spectators turned up. The game will always be remembered by the British for their captain Clive Sullivan's wonderful long distance try and by the Australians for perhaps "the greatest try never scored", later shown on TV to be legitimately scored by Australian fullback Graeme Langlands but disallowed by French referee Georges Jameau. Mike Stephenson scored the 73rd-minute try that helped Great Britain level the scores and secure the World Cup. Had Aussie winger Ray Branighan succeeded with a 79th-minute penalty or Bob Fulton landed one of three drop goal attempts in the last five minutes, the cup could easily have gone to Australia. But for the first time in the competition's history the scores were level at full-time. An additional twenty minutes extra time was played, but no further score resulted, and Great Britain were awarded the cup by virtue of a better position in the table.

Try scorers 
5

  Bob Fulton

4

  Clive Sullivan

3

  John Atkinson
  Phil Lowe
  Mike Stephenson

2

  Mark Harris
  John O'Neill
  Paul Sait
  Jean-Marie Bonal
  Andre Ruiz
  John Holmes
  Phillip Orchard
  John Whittaker

1

  Arthur Beetson
  Tommy Raudonikis
  Elwyn Walters
  Dennis Ward
  Paul Charlton
  Chris Hesketh
  David Jeanes
  Steve Nash
  George Nicholls
  Dennis O'Neill
  Mocky Brereton
  Bill Burgoyne
  Tony Coll
  Murray Eade
  Dennis Williams

References

External links 
 1972 World Cup at rlhalloffame.org.uk
 1972 World Cup at rugbyleagueproject.com
 1972 World Cup Final at eraofthebiff.com
 When Great Britain won the World Cup at bbc.co.uk
 1972 World Cup Final at timesonline.co.uk
 1972 World Cup data at hunterlink.net.au
 1972 World Cup at 188-rugby-league.co.uk